The 1942 Pittsburgh Panthers football team represented the University of Pittsburgh in the 1942 college football season.  The team compiled a 3–6 record under head coach Charley Bowser.

Schedule

References

Pittsburgh
Pittsburgh Panthers football seasons
Pittsburgh Panthers football